The 1957–58 Federation Cup was the second season of the Turkish Federation Cup. The winner of the competition would represent Turkey at the 1958–59 European Cup. It was also the last edition of the Federation Cup, for the next season would be the Turkish First Football League. 38 clubs participated: 20 from Istanbul, 10 from İzmir, and 8 from Ankara. Beşiktaş won the title for the second time.

First round

Istanbul Group

İzmir Group

Second round

Istanbul Group

İzmir Group

Ankara Group

Third round
In the third round the remaining 8 teams were split into 2 groups of 4 (red group and white group).

Red Group

White Group

Group stage

Red Group

White Group

Final
The final was held at Dolmabahçe Stadium.

External links
 RSSSF

Turkish Federation Cup
Cup
Turkey